Before Turning the Gun on Himself... is the eighth stand-up comedy album by Doug Stanhope. It was released on November 6, 2012, by Roadrunner Records. It was recorded live at The Complex in Salt Lake City, Utah. The album peaked at #1 on the US Billboard Comedy Albums chart and #11 on the Heatseekers Albums chart.

Track listing

Chart history

References

External links
 Doug Stanhope's official website
 Roadrunner Records

2012 live albums
Doug Stanhope albums
Roadrunner Records live albums
2010s comedy albums
Stand-up comedy albums
2010s spoken word albums
Spoken word albums by American artists
Live spoken word albums